Hubert Fairbairn Davidson (August 6, 1902 – May 4, 1961) was a Canadian professional ice hockey player. He played with the Regina Capitals of the Western Canada Hockey League.

References

External links

1902 births
1961 deaths
Ice hockey people from Saskatchewan
Regina Capitals players
Canadian ice hockey centres